Carl Vilhelm Ludwig Charlier (1 April 1862 – 4 November 1934) was a Swedish astronomer.  His parents were Emmerich Emanuel and Aurora Kristina (née Hollstein) Charlier.

Career
Charlier was born in Östersund.  He received his Ph.D. from Uppsala University in 1887, later worked there and at the Stockholm Observatory and was Professor of Astronomy and Director of the Observatory at Lund University from 1897.

He made extensive statistical studies of the stars in our galaxy and their positions and motions, and tried to develop a model of the galaxy based on this. He proposed the siriometer as a unit of stellar distance.

Charlier was also interested in pure statistics and played a role in the development of statistics in Swedish academia. Several of his pupils became statisticians, working at universities and in government and companies.

Related to his work on galactic structure, he also developed a cosmological theory based on the work of Johann Heinrich Lambert. In the resulting Lambert-Charlier Hierarchical Cosmology, increasingly large areas of space contain decreasing densities of matter, the principle being introduced to avoid the observational inconsistency that would otherwise emerge from Olbers's paradox.

Late in his career, he translated Isaac Newton's Principia into Swedish.  He died in Lund, aged 72.

James Craig Watson Medal (1924)
Bruce Medal (1933)
Named after him
Charlier (lunar crater)
Charlier (Martian crater) on Mars
Asteroid 8677 Charlier
Charlier polynomials

Publications
Carl Ludwig Charlier: 	Die Mechanik des Himmels, 1902–1907, Leipzig: Veit, (2 volumes) (2nd edition in 1927)
Lectures on Stellar Statistics. Charlier. 1921

References

 MNRAS 95 (1935) 339

Bibliography
 Gustav Holmberg, Reaching for the Stars: Studies in the History of Swedish Stellar and Nebular Astronomy, 1860-1940 (Lund, 1999) 
 Gustav Holmberg, "C.V.L. Charlier", in

External links
 Bruce Medal page
 Awarding of Bruce Medal: PASP 45 (1933) 5
 Gustav Holmberg: Astronomy in Sweden 1860-1940
 
 

1862 births
1934 deaths
19th-century Swedish astronomers
Swedish statisticians
Uppsala University alumni
People from Östersund
Academic staff of Lund University
20th-century Swedish astronomers